Ülo Mattheus (born 7 December 1956 in Tallinn) is an Estonian writer, journalist, civil servant and editor.

In 1975 he graduated from 32nd secondary school in Tallinn. He has been transport worker, television lighting man, later also literary editor of the journal Sirp. From 2005 until 2013, he was a press consultant for the Riigikogu. Since 2014 he was the executive editor for TEA encyclopedia.

Awards:
 1985 and 1994: Friedebert Tuglas short story award
 1996: Literature Endowment annual award

Works

 1989: novel "Kuma". Tallinn: Eesti Raamat, 1989. 164 pp.
 1996: novel "Läheb ega peatu". Tallinn: Eesti Keele Instituut, 1996. 350 pp.
 2006: novel "India armastus: fragmendid kirjadest". Tallinn: Eesti Keele Sihtasutus, 2006. 196 pp.
 2013: novel "Tema salajane palve". Tallinn: Tuum, 2013. 208 pp.

References

Living people
1956 births
Estonian male novelists
Estonian male short story writers
20th-century Estonian novelists
21st-century Estonian novelists
Estonian editors
Estonian journalists
Estonian civil servants
Writers from Tallinn
People from Tallinn